Kalle Toivo Immanuel Harjunpää (2 June 1910 – 21 September 1995) was a Finnish-American Lutheran priest and professor.

Background
Harjunpää was born in Rauma, Finland. Harjunpää was ordained to the priesthood 18 February 1936 in Turku Cathedral. His background was in the Finnish Evangelical Revivalist Movement, originating from the activity of neo-Lutheran priest Fredrik Gabriel Hedberg. As a young priest while learning the New Testament, he was convinced of the importance of Christian ecumenism which was unpopular at that time in Finland. Soon after that Yngve Brilioth's book Eucharistic Faith and Practise. Evangelical and Catholic and Hans Liezmann's Messe und Herrenmal gave him more direction towards the Ecumenical Movement and Liturgical Movement.

Career
After short curacy in Vehmaa and a job in the student union of his revivalist movement, Harjunpää became pastor of Finnish Seamen's Mission in London from 1938 to 1945, and the secretary of Archbishop Aleksi Lehtonen from 1945 to 1948. Together with Martti Parvio he founded a high church circle which was informally referred to as "Liturgical Brethren."

In May 1948, Harjunpää immigrated to the United States. He became a teacher at Pacific Lutheran Theological Seminary in 1953 and was professor of church history of the Graduate Theological Union from 1963 until 1977, when he retired. He was member of many Lutheran commissions on Hymnology and liturgy. He was also member of Societas Sanctae Birgittae.

Harjunpää died at his home in Berkeley, California in 1995.

References

Harjunpää, Toivo: Muistelmia pappisurani alkutaipaleelta. Kotimatkalla 1990 (annual of Lutheran Evangelical Association in Finland)
Suomen teologit 1990. Suomen kirkon pappisliitto 1990, Lahti 
Parvio, Martti: The Liturgical Brethren. a page in history of the post-war liturgical movement in Finland. – article in Ecclesia, Leiturgia, Ministerium: Studia in Honorem Toivo Harjunpää. Helsinki 1977.

External links 

1910 births
1995 deaths
People from Rauma, Finland
People from Turku and Pori Province (Grand Duchy of Finland)
20th-century Finnish Lutheran clergy
Finnish Lutheran theologians
Finnish emigrants to the United States
American Lutheran theologians
20th-century Protestant theologians
20th-century American non-fiction writers